Bemiparin (trade names Ivor and Zibor, among others) is an antithrombotic and belongs to the group of low molecular weight heparins (LMWH).

Medical uses
Bemiparin is used for the prevention of thromboembolism after surgery, and to prevent blood clotting in the extracorporeal circuit in haemodialysis.

Contraindications
The medication is contraindicated in patients with a history of heparin-induced thrombocytopenia with or without disseminated intravascular coagulation; acute bleeding or risk of bleeding; injury or surgery of the central nervous system, eyes or ears; severe liver or pancreas impairment; and acute or subacute bacterial endocarditis.

Interactions 

No interaction studies have been conducted. Drugs that are expected to increase the risk of bleeding in combination with bemiparin include other anticoagulants, aspirin and other NSAIDs, antiplatelet drugs, and corticosteroids.

Chemistry
Like semuloparin, bemiparin is classified as an ultra-LMWH because of its low molecular mass of 3600 g/mol on average. (Enoxaparin has 4500 g/mol.) These heparins have lower anti-thrombin activity than classical LMWHs and act mainly on factor Xa, reducing the risk of bleeding.

References

External links 
 

Heparins
Organic sodium salts